Solomon Silwany (born March 14, 1983) is a Ugandan politician and a member of the 11th parliament representing Bukooli County Central. He is a member of the National Resistance Movement (NRM).

Education 
Silwany holds a bachelor of Arts Degree from Makerere University.

Political career 
Silwany is a member of parliament who previously served on the Natural Resources Committee and former Deputy Chairperson of the NRM caucus in the parliament. He was elected to the Parliamentary Commission – the highest decision-making organ of Parliament in the 11th parliament replacing Peter Ogwang.

References 

Living people
1983 births
21st-century Ugandan politicians
Members of the Parliament of Uganda
National Resistance Movement politicians
Makerere University alumni